There are several lakes named Mud Lake within the Canadian province of Saskatchewan.

 Little Quill Lake, also known as Mud Lake, located north of Wynyard, Saskatchewan.   
 Mud Lake, located southwest of Moosomin, Saskatchewan.   
This lake is located within Moose Mountain Provincial Park.
 Mud Lake, located north of Canora, Saskatchewan, near Sturgis, Saskatchewan.  
 Mud Lake, also located north of Canora, Saskatchewan, near Swan Plain, Saskatchewan.

References
 Canadian Geographical Names Data Base

Lakes of Saskatchewan